Billy Woodward (2 July 1907 – 1975) was an English footballer who played as an inside left for Manchester United, Tranmere Rovers and Chesterfield. He made 113 appearances for Tranmere, scoring 46 goals.

References

1907 births
1975 deaths
People from West Auckland
Footballers from County Durham
Association football inside forwards
English footballers
Manchester United F.C. players
Tranmere Rovers F.C. players
Chesterfield F.C. players